"If They Could See Us Now" is an episode of the BBC sitcom, Only Fools and Horses, first screened on 25 December 2001 as the first part of the early 2000s Christmas trilogy and the sixteenth Christmas special. In the episode, the Trotters lose their fortune and Del goes on a game show to try to regain some of it.

Following the closing credits, there is a dedication to the memory of Buster Merryfield (who played Uncle Albert) and Kenneth MacDonald (who played The Nag's Head landlord Mike), who had both died since the previous episode.

Plot
The episode opens with Del Boy and Rodney explaining their latest holiday to a barrister. While at a Monaco resort, Rodney feels guilty about not taking Uncle Albert with them, but Del reminds him that he is happily co-habiting with Elsie Partridge in Weston-super-Mare. Later, Del learns that the Central American stock market has crashed, meaning the Trotters have lost all of their money. The Trotter family escapes from the hotel without paying.

As he is entering a courtroom, Del explains that Mike is now in prison for embezzlement, and that he and Rodney lost their country estate and penthouse apartment, which were seized by the Inland Revenue to pay off their debts. However, they do still own their flat at Nelson Mandela House. Adding to their grief, Albert dies a few days later, and the Trotters mistakenly attend the funeral of Albert Warren, who also happened to be a World War II veteran – they find this out only when the family mention his nickname "Bunny" and that he was in the Royal Air Force instead of the Royal Navy.

Back at the flat, Rodney reveals that he has been acquitted of any responsibility in the collapse of their company. On the other hand, Del has been both declared bankrupt and convicted of nearly twenty years' worth of tax evasion. While his sentence is suspended, if he cannot pay off a bill of £48,754 plus interest within the next year, the Inland Revenue will seize all of the Trotters' remaining assets, including the flat, and Del himself will receive a two-year prison sentence. The situation is hopeless, but Del is optimistic about his chances of earning the required money, and announces that he will reform Trotters Independent Traders. Since Del has been disqualified from owning any company, the new version will be managed by Rodney.

A few days later, Rodney and Cassandra discuss how best to celebrate Rodney's promotion, eventually deciding on dressing up for each other. The next day, Mickey Pearce phones Rodney pretending to be an associate of the Sultan of Brunei. Later that night, Del, Raquel, and Damien get ready to go out while Rodney listens to a Mozart record. Trigger arrives, stating that Del promised him a lift to the pub despite the fact that he lives closer to The Nag's Head than the Trotters – and has to pass the pub to get to the Trotters' flat – but Trigger insists that Del offered him a lift and that was his purpose. Later, unaware that Del is still in the flat, Cassandra enters the living room dressed as a policewoman followed by Rodney dressed as a Roman gladiator (supposed to be Russell Crowe, whom Cassandra finds attractive).

It turns out that Del is going to be a contestant on the gameshow Goldrush (a parody of Who Wants to Be a Millionaire?), which is hosted by Jonathan Ross, and takes Damien and Raquel with him. Del's chances initially seem bleak after he gets the first question wrong, but the other two contestants are even worse than he is, and Del manages to reach the "Rainbow Road", putting him in pole position for the top prize. Eventually, Del has to phone Rodney when he does not know the answer to a question. Rodney initially mistakes Ross for Mickey Pearce, until he looks at the television and then tries to help Del with the final question, correctly naming the composer of "The Child and the Enchantment" as Ravel, but this answer is not accepted and Del is eliminated.

Raquel and Damien return home via taxi because Del abandoned them after losing. After he eventually returns, Del gets a phone call from the producer, telling them that he got the final question right, and will be given his prize money as well as another go on the show. However, Del thinks that it is Mickey Pearce prank calling them again and tells him to give all the prize money to charity. The episode ends as Del proudly announces "We're the Trotters, and we're back!"

Episode cast

Music
Ricky Martin – "Livin' la Vida Loca"
Spandau Ballet – "Gold"
Robbie Williams and Nicole Kidman – "Somethin' Stupid"
Wolfgang Amadeus Mozart – "Symphony No.38 in D Major"
S Club 7 – "Never Had a Dream Come True"
Kylie Minogue – "Can't Get You Out of My Head"
Lou Bega – "Mambo No. 5"

References

External links

2001 British television episodes
British Christmas television episodes
Only Fools and Horses special episodes